Ukdungle is a small Indian Army military compound entirely contained within a 40 by 70 meter area in Leh district, Ladakh in northern India, 48 km west of Demchok village on the Line of Actual Control with Tibet. Nurbula pass is close to this place.

References

Villages in Nyoma tehsil